Gérard Natter is a French curler.

At the national level, he is a 1982 French men's champion curler.

Teams

References

External links
 

Living people
French male curlers
French curling champions
Year of birth missing (living people)
Place of birth missing (living people)